The Western Connecticut Youth Orchestra (WCYO) is a not-for-profit organization providing young musicians in the Fairfield County and upper Westchester County areas with classical symphonic, concert band and string orchestra experience through participation in the Symphony Orchestra, Wind Ensemble and String Ensemble respectively.  The WCYO mission is to provide an opportunity for young musicians to develop their musical talents through education and performance, to foster an awareness and appreciation of standard and modern repertoire, and to provide cultural enrichment to the surrounding communities. Based in Ridgefield, Connecticut, the WCYO orchestras have toured in Sweden, Austria, and Paris, and have performed at Carnegie Hall and Avery Fisher Hall at Lincoln Center. Auditions are required for acceptance into the ensembles.

History 
The WCYO was founded in 2003 as the Ridgefield Symphony Youth Orchestra. Twenty-five young musicians were selected as members of the inaugural youth orchestra, which began weekly rehearsals in January 2003. In the fall of 2005, the program grew to include a String Ensemble which allowed the organization to reach and nurture a broader range of musical talents and abilities. As part of its goal to establish greater recognition of the organization's regional focus, in August 2008 the organization changed its name to the Western Connecticut Youth Orchestra. In 2010, the program further expanded to include the Wind Ensemble. Together the three ensembles consist of nearly 100 auditioned musicians age 8 through 18, hailing from 20 towns in CT and NY.

Orchestras 
 Western Connecticut Youth Orchestra, Symphony Orchestra -- Eric Mahl, Music Director
 Western Connecticut Youth Orchestra, String Ensemble -- Tristan Rais-Sherman, Conductor
 Western Connecticut Youth Orchestra, Wind Ensemble -- Albert Montecalvo, Conductor

References

External links 
 Official Western Connecticut Youth Orchestra website

American youth orchestras
Ridgefield, Connecticut
Musical groups from Connecticut
2003 establishments in Connecticut
Musical groups established in 2003
Youth organizations based in Connecticut
Performing arts in Connecticut